Alcyone of Thessaly was a Thessalian princess and later on queen of Trachis. 

Alcyone may also refer to:
 Alcyone (star), the brightest star in the Pleiades cluster
 Alcyone (mythology), name of different individuals in mythology
 Alcyone (opera), a 1706 opera by Marin Marais
 Alcyone (Ravel cantata), a cantata by Maurice Ravel
 Alcyone (ship), any one of several vessels by that name
 Alcyone, the pseudonymous author of the book At the Feet of the Master, attributed to Jiddu Krishnamurti or C. W. Leadbeater
 Alcyone, a pseudonym of Jiddu Krishnamurti
 Subaru Alcyone, or Subaru XT, an automobile
 Alcyone, a character in Magic Knight Rayearth. Named after the Subaru Alcyone automobile

See also 
 Alcione (disambiguation)
 Alcyon (disambiguation)
 Halcyon (disambiguation)